FC Alania Vladikavkaz is a Russian football team from Vladikavkaz. Founded in 1921, the club played in the Soviet Top League during the communist era, and won its first and only league title in the 1995 Russian Top League.

Background

Since the Russian football league system was established in 1992, the main team representing Vladikavkaz changed ownership structure several times, also changing the team name from FC Spartak Vladikavkaz to FC Spartak-Alania and FC Alania and back to Spartak. In the 2018–19 Russian Professional Football League season, the team was financed by the provincial government and played as Spartak. Before the 2019–20 season, a new team, privately owned and called FC Alania was organized and licensed for PFL. However, FC Spartak also remained in the league for 2019–20, even though many players and coaches moved to the "new Alania".

As a result of the COVID-19 pandemic in Russia, 2019–20 Russian Football National League season was abandoned and none of the teams were relegated. After the licensing, the league had 23 teams eligible for the 2020–21 season. Having an odd number of teams would mean one team would get a bye on each matchday and the league preferred to have an even number of teams, therefore it invited PFL teams to apply for the license. Out of the teams that applied, on 24 July 2020 Alania was selected by the Russian Football Union for promotion to FNL. On 15 May 2021, they secured a 4th place in the FNL which would normally qualify the club for Russian Premier League promotion playoffs. Alania failed to receive a Premier League license due to unacceptable condition of their stadium and therefore the playoffs were cancelled.

Domestic

Soviet Union
{| class="wikitable mw-collapsible mw-collapsed" align=center cellspacing="0" cellpadding="3" style="border:1px solid #AAAAAA;font-size:90%"
|- style="background:#efefef;"
! Season
! Div.
! Pos.
! Pl.
! W
! D
! L
! GS
! GA
! P
!Cup
!colspan=2|Europe
!Top Scorer (League)
|-
||1960||2nd, RSFSR-3||14||26||3||4||19||26||68||10||-||colspan="2"|-||
|-
||1961||2nd, RSFSR-4||10||24||6||6||12||32||57||18||1/64||colspan="2"|-||
|-
||1962||2nd, RSFSR-3|| style="background:pink;"|8||28||10||6||12||38||36||26||1/128||colspan="2"|-||
|-
||1963||3rd, RSFSR-3||7||30||12||8||10||47||39||32||1/512||colspan="2"|-||
|-
|rowspan="2"|1964||3rd, RSFSR-4||4||34||16||7||11||53||35||39||rowspan="2"|1/512||rowspan="2" colspan="2"|-||
|-
||3rd, RSFSR-final||4||8||3||2||3||9||10||8||
|-
||1965||rowspan="2"|3rd, RSFSR-4||9||38||16||7||15||54||43||39||-||colspan="2"|-||
|-
|rowspan="2"|1966||1||38||22||9||7||80||40||53||rowspan="2"|1/32||rowspan="2" colspan="2"|-||
|-
||3rd, RSFSR-final|| style="background:lightgreen;"|2||7||4||1||2||9||4||9||
|-
||1967||2nd, group 1||16||38||10||11||17||34||45||31||1/32||colspan="2"|-||
|-
||1968||2nd, group 3||2||40||19||12||9||53||29||50||1/64||colspan="2"|-||align="left"| Kaishauri: 18
|-
|rowspan="2"|1969||2nd, group 1||1||38||22||12||4||60||25||60||rowspan="2"|1/64||rowspan="2" colspan="2"|-|| rowspan="2" style="text-align:left;"| Papelishvili: 16
|-
||2nd, final|| style="background:lightgreen;"|1||3||2||0||1||4||2||4
|-
||1970||Top League|| style="background:pink;"|17||32||7||8||17||31||48||22||1/16||colspan="2"|-||align="left"| Kaishauri: 8
|-
||1971||rowspan="11"|2nd||5||42||19||7||16||52||57||45||1/16||colspan="2"|-||align="left"| Zazroev: 11
|-
||1972||9||38||14||10||14||49||50||38||1/16||colspan="2"|-||align="left"| Kaishauri: 18
|-
||1973||17||38||13||7||18||29||44||30||1/16||colspan="2"|-||align="left"| Kaishauri: 7
|-
||1974||17||38||15||4||19||45||67||34||1/32||colspan="2"|-||align="left"| Kitaev: 17
|-
||1975||9||38||15||7||16||41||43||37||1/32||colspan="2"|-||align="left"| V. Gazzaev: 14
|-
||1976||15||38||11||14||13||40||50||36||1/32||colspan="2"|-||align="left"| Kaishauri: 11
|-
||1977||15||38||11||11||16||38||45||33||1/32||colspan="2"|-||align="left"| Khuadonov: 6
|-
||1978||18||38||10||8||20||30||50||28||1/16||colspan="2"|-||align="left"| Khuadonov: 9
|-
||1979||13||46||19||7||20||49||44||45||group stage||colspan="2"|-||align="left"| Suanov,  Zazroev: 9
|-
||1980||15||46||17||9||20||43||50||43||group stage||colspan="2"|-||align="left"| Khuadonov: 9
|-
||1981|| style="background:pink;"|21||46||14||12||20||36||49||40||group stage||colspan="2"|-||align="left"| Y. Gazzaev: 10
|-
|rowspan="2"|1982||3rd, zone 3||1||32||22||6||4||64||18||50||rowspan="2"|-||rowspan="2" colspan="2"|-||align="left"| Y. Gazzaev: 23
|-
||3rd, final-1||2||4||1||2||1||5||4||4||
|-
|rowspan="2"|1983||3rd, zone 3||1||30||23||2||5||69||23||48||rowspan="2"|-||rowspan="2" colspan="2"|-||
|-
||3rd, final-2|| style="background:lightgreen;"|1||4||1||3||0||2||0||5||
|-
||1984||rowspan="7"|2nd||16||42||15||8||19||42||51||38||1/32||colspan="2"|-||align="left"| Argudyaev: 13
|-
||1985||16||38||17||4||17||49||52||38||1/16||colspan="2"|-||align="left"| Ambalov: 12
|-
||1986||16||46||15||12||19||58||66||42||1/64||colspan="2"|-||align="left"| Ploshnik: 16
|-
||1987||18||42||12||12||18||37||46||36||1/64||colspan="2"|-||align="left"| Gagloev: 8
|-
||1988||13||42||15||9||8||57||60||39||1/32||colspan="2"|-||align="left"| Y. Gazzaev: 10
|-
||1989||17||42||12||11||19||44||61||35||1/64||colspan="2"|-||align="left"| Y. Gazzaev: 10,  Tskhovrebov: 7
|-
||1990|| style="background:lightgreen;"|1||38||24||9||5||73||30||57||1/64||colspan="2"|-||align="left"| Tedeev: 23
|-
||1991||Top League||11||30||9||8||13||33||41||26||1/64||colspan="2"|-||align="left"| Suleymanov: 13
|-
||1992||-||-||-||-||-||-||-||-||-||1/16||colspan="2"|-||
|}

Russia
{| class="wikitable mw-collapsible mw-collapsed" align=center cellspacing="0" cellpadding="3" style="border:1px solid #AAAAAA;font-size:90%"
|- style="background:#efefef;"
! Season
! Div.
! Pos.
! Pl.
! W
! D
! L
! GS
! GA
! P
!Cup
!colspan=2|Europe
!Top Scorer (League)
|-
||1992||rowspan="14"|RFPL|| style="background:silver;"|2||26||13||6||7||47||33||32||-||colspan="2"|-||align="left"| Suleymanov: 12
|-
||1993||6||34||16||6||12||49||45||38||1/16||colspan="2"|-||align="left"| Suleymanov,  Markhel: 14
|-
||1994||5||30||11||11||8||32||34||33||1/2||UC||R1||align="left"| Suleymanov: 6
|-
||1995|| style="background:gold;"|1||30||22||5||3||63||21||71||1/2||colspan="2"|-||align="left"| Kavelashvili: 12
|-
||1996|| style="background:silver;"|2||35||22||6||7||65||37||72||1/16||UC||R1||align="left"| Suleymanov,  Tedeev,  Kasymov: 11
|-
||1997||10||34||14||4||16||52||42||46||1/8||UC||R1||align="left"| Yanovsky: 13
|-
||1998||8||30||11||7||12||46||39||40||1/2||UC||R1||align="left"| Demetradze: 14
|-
||1999||6||30||12||7||11||54||45||43||1/8||colspan="2"|-||align="left"| Demetradze: 21
|-
||2000||10||30||10||8||12||34||36||38||1/16||colspan="2"|-||align="left"| Tedeev: 10
|-
||2001||11||30||8||8||14||31||47||32||1/16||UC||R1||align="left"| Paolo Emilio: 6
|-
||2002||12||30||8||6||16||31||42||30||1/16||colspan="2"|-||align="left"| Demetradze,  D. Bazaev: 6
|-
||2003||13||30||9||4||17||23||43||31||1/16||colspan="2"|-||align="left"| Mikholap: 4
|-
||2004||14||30||7||7||16||28||52||28||1/8||colspan="2"|-||align="left"| G. Bazaev,  Tudor: 5
|-
||2005|| style="background:pink;"|15||30||5||8||17||27||53||23||1/8||colspan="2"|-||align="left"| D. Bazaev: 9
|-
||2006||3rd, "South"|| style="background:lightgreen;"|1||32||27||3||2||81||20||84||1/16||colspan="2"|-||align="left"| Dubrovin: 28
|-
||2007||rowspan="3"|2nd||12||42||15||11||16||56||56||56||1/64||colspan="2"|-||align="left"| Dubrovin: 19
|-
||2008||10||42||17||8||17||50||41||59||1/32||colspan="2"|-||align="left"| Dadu: 18
|-
||2009|| style="background:lightgreen;"|3||38||21||7||10||57||30||70||1/16||colspan="2"|-||align="left"| Dadu: 12
|-
||2010||RFPL|| style="background:pink;"|15||30||4||8||18||34||58||20|| style="background:silver;"|F||colspan="2"|-||align="left"| Gabulov,  Marenich: 4
|-
||2011–12 ||2nd|| style="background:lightgreen;"|2||52||28||13||11||66||39||97||1/32||colspan="2"|-||align="left"| Bikmaev: 11
|-
||2012–13 ||RFPL|| style="background:pink;"|16||30||4||7||19||26||53||19||1/16||colspan="2"|-||align="left"| Neco: 9
|-
||2013–14 ||2nd|| style="background:grey;"|12||36||14||4||18||29||52||46||1/16||colspan="2"|-||align="left"| Khastsayev: 13
|-
||2014–15 ||rowspan="6"|3rd, "South"||17||20||5||6||9|| |21||33||21 ||1/256||colspan="2"|-||align="left"| Burayev: 12
|-
||2015–16 ||style=";"|11||24||4||7||13||15||37||19||1/256||colspan="2"|-||align="left"| Sikoyev: 7
|-
||2016–17 ||style=";"|10||30||10||7||13||26||36||37||1/128||colspan="2"|-||align="left"| Gatikoev: 8
|-
||2017–18 ||style=";"|13||32||8||8||16||26||41||32||1/256||colspan="2"|-||align="left"| Gurtsiev: 5
|-
||2018–19 ||style=";"|10||28||8||6||14||36||48||30||1/64||colspan="2"|-||align="left"| Zhabkin: 8
|-
||2019–20
||2||19||15||1||3||54||13||46||1/16||colspan="2"|-||align="left"| Khadartsev: 12
|-
||2020–2021 ||rowspan="2"|2nd||4||42||22||11||9||74||40||77||1/64||colspan="2"|-||align="left"|Gurtsiyev: 13
|-
||2021–2022 ||style=";"|6||38||17||9||12||75||53||60||1/2||colspan="2"|-||align="left"| Mashukov: 14
|}

European

Honours
 Russian Premier League
Winners (1): 1995
Runners-up (2): 1992, 1996
 Russian Cup
Runners-up (1): 2010–11
Soviet First League
Winners (2): 1969, 1990
Russian Football National League
Runners-up (1): 2011–12
Soviet Second League / Russian Professional Football League
Winners (2): 1983, 2006
Runners-up (2): 1966, 1982

Coaching staff

Current squad
As of 22 February 2023, according to the FNL website.

Reserve team

Notable players

 Valeriy Gazzaev
  Stanislav Cherchesov
  Zaur Khapov
  Viktor Bulatov
  Vasili Baranov
  Victor Onopko
  Yuri Kovtun
  Artur Pagayev
  Bakhva Tedeev
  Omari Tetradze
 Soslan Dzhanayev
 Igor Yanovsky
 Spartak Gogniyev
 Alan Kasaev
 Mikhail Kavelashvili
 Giorgi Demetradze
 Murtaz Shelia
 Mikheil Ashvetia
 Levan Kobiashvili
 Giorgi Chanturia
 Mirjalol Qosimov
 Tamás Priskin
  Renan Bressan
 Dacosta Goore
 Isaac Okoronkwo
 Sani Kaita
 Ognjen Vranješ
 Deividas Semberas
 Ibrahim Gnanou
 George Florescu
 Cristian Tudor
 Rodolfo Zelaya
 Royston Drenthe
 Nazim Suleymanov
 Sergiu Dadu
 Kosta Barbarouses

Former coaches

 Grigoriy Gornostaev (1966–1967)
 Mussa Tsalikov (1967)
 Andrei Zazroyev (1968–1970)
 Kazbek Tuaev (1970)
 Sergei Korshunov (1971)
 Dmitri Chikhradze (1971)
 Andrei Zazroyev (1972)
 Ivan Larin (1973)
 Kazbek Tuaev (1974–1977)
 Viktor Belov (1977–1978)
 Mussa Tsalikov (1978–1980)
 Andrei Zazroyev (1980–1981)
 Aleksandr Kochetkov (1982)
 Valeri Maslov (1983)
 Ivan Varlamov (1984)
 Valeri Ovchinnikov (1985–1986)
 Igor Zazroyev (1986–1987)
 Oleg Romantsev (1988)
 Valeriy Gazzaev (1989–1991)
 Nikolay Khudiyev (1991)
 Aleksandr Novikov (1992–1993)
 Valeriy Gazzaev (1994–1999)
 Vladimir Gutsaev (2000)
 Aleksandr Averyanov (2000–2001)
 Aleksandr Yanovskiy (2001–2002)
 Volodymyr Muntyan (2002)
 Bakhva Tedeyev (2002)
 Revaz Dzodzuashvili (2003)
 Nikolay Khudiyev (2003)
 Bakhva Tedeyev (2003–2004)
 Rolland Courbis (2004–2005)
 Yuri Sekinaev (2004)
 Bakhva Tedeyev (2005)
 Edgar Gess (2005)
 Itzhak Shum (2005)
 Aleksandr Yanovskiy (2005–2006)
 Boris Stukalov (2006–2007)
 Stanislav Tskhovrebov (2007-2008)
 Valery Petrakov (2009)
 Mircea Rednic (2009)
 Vladimir Shevchuk (2010–2011)
 Vladimir Gazzayev (2011–2012, 2013-2014) 
 Valeriy Gazzaev (2012–2013)
 Artur Pagayev (2014–2015)
 Zaur Tedeyev (2015–2016)
 Fyodor Gagloyev (2016)
 Marat Dzoblayev (2016-2017)
 Yuri Gazzaev (2018)
 Spartak Gogniyev (2019–2022)
 Zaur Tedeyev (2022-current)

References

External links
 Official website

Association football clubs established in 1921
Football clubs in Russia
Sport in Vladikavkaz
1921 establishments in Russia